Karunai Prakasar  (Tamil: கருணை பிரகாசர் ) was a seventeenth century Saiva spiritual writer. He was born to a Tamil-speaking Desikar family in Kanchipuram, Tamil Nadu. He was a spiritual writer who wrote more than five books. . He worshipped Saiva Siddantha. He got married when he was sixteen. He attained Mukthi Motcha  at the age of eighteen. Therefore, he had no children.

Life
He was born in the town of Kanchipuram, Thondai Mandalam in Tamil Nadu, South India into an orthodox Saiva Tamil (Desikar) family around the middle of the 17th century. His father Kumarasamy Desikar was a respectable spiritual leader and the Archaka and Dikshithar for the people of Thondai Mandalam. His father left his family and went to Thiruvannamalai with his disciples. There he planned to become a Sage but failed to do so. God wast married and fathered three sons and a daughter. Karunai Prakasar was the second child, and his siblings included Siva Prakasar, Velaiyar, and Gnambikai ammal.

Siva Prakasar, his elder brother, the poet who was blessed as ‘Sivanuputhichelvar’. His sister Gnambikai Ammal married Perur Santhalinga Swamigal. His younger brother, Velaiyar married Meenatchi Ammal. He had a son named Sundaresanar.

Along with his elder brother Sivaprakasa swamigal, he travelled widely all over Tamil Nadu, famous temples like Thiruvannamalai, Thiruchendur. On one of his journeys around Tamil Nadu Sivaprakasa Swamigal, Karunai prakasar and Velaiyar went to Tirunelveli to meet and be taught by a pandit Valliyur Thambiran, who was an expert on grammar. This teacher accepted them as his student. Karunai prakasar learnt Tamil grammar along with his brothers. After that, he married Kamatchi at age 16. He attained mukthi motcha in Thiruvengai at the age of eighteen. His elder brother Sivaprakasa Swamigal and younger brother Velaiyar came to see his graveyard.

Books

 Seegalathi sarukkam l
 Ishtalinga Agaval

References

External links

Tamil-language literature
18th-century Indian philosophers
Indian Hindu spiritual teachers
People from Kanchipuram district
1756 births
1774 deaths
Scholars from Tamil Nadu